Ryan Walters may refer to:
 Ryan Walters (ice hockey)
 Ryan Walters (American football)
 Ryan Walters (politician)

See also
 Ryan Walter, Canadian ice hockey centre